Bogwang-dong is a dong (neighbourhood) of Yongsan-gu in Seoul, South Korea.

Education 
 Osan High School
 Osan Middle School

See also 
Administrative divisions of South Korea

References

External links
 Yongsan-gu official website
 Yongsan-gu official website
 Bogwang-dong resident office website

Neighbourhoods of Yongsan District